The European Journal of Pharmacology  is a peer-reviewed scientific journal in the field of pharmacology. It publishes full-length papers on the mechanisms of action of chemical substances affecting biological systems, and short reviews debating recent advances in rapidly developing fields within its scope.

Papers are presented under these headings:
 Behavioral pharmacology
Neuropharmacology and analgesia
 Cardiovascular pharmacology
 Pulmonary, gastrointestinal and urogenital pharmacology
 Endocrine pharmacology
 Immunopharmacology and inflammation
 Molecular and cellular pharmacology
 Regenerative pharmacology
 Biologicals and biotherapeutics
 Translational pharmacology
 Nutriceutical pharmacology

External links 
 

Pharmacology journals
Elsevier academic journals
Publications established in 1967
English-language journals